Jennifer Alice Moody is an American archaeologist, and research fellow at University of Texas at Austin.

She studies the archaeology, and environmental history of Crete.

Awards
 1989 MacArthur Fellows Program

Works
 Alan Peatfield, Jennifer Moody, Stavroula Markoulaki (2000) "The Ayios Vasilios Valley Archaeological Survey: a preliminary report", Proceedings of the 8th Cretological Congress Iraklion, Crete, pp. 359–371
"Survey Methodology", Reports on the Vrokastro Area, Eastern Crete: The settlement history of the Vrokastro area and related studies, UPenn Museum of Archaeology, 2004, 
 Contributions to Aegean archaeology: studies in honor of William A. McDonald, Editors William Andrew McDonald, Nancy C. Wilkie, William D. E. Coulson, Kendall/Hunt Pub. Co., 1985, 
"Relative sea-level changes in Crete: reassessment of radiocarbon dates from Sphakia and West Crete", Oxford Research Archive "Annual of the British School at Athens" 97 171-200
Oliver Rackham and Jennifer Moody (1996), The Making of the Cretan Landscape, Manchester University Press, Manchester and New York

References

External links
The Sphakia Survey: Internet Edition , University of Oxford, 2000
"Excavations at Nichoria in Southwest Greece: The Bronze Age occupation", Authors	George Robert Rapp, Stanley E. Aschenbrenner, University of Minnesota Press, 1992, 

American archaeologists
University of Texas at Austin faculty
MacArthur Fellows
Living people
Year of birth missing (living people)
American women archaeologists
American women academics
21st-century American women